Sister Swap is an American series of TV films, starring sisters Kimberly Williams-Paisley and Ashley Williams. The films were originally broadcast on Hallmark Channel, as part of the channel's "Countdown to Christmas" seasonal programming.

In December 2022, Dan Harmon posted on social media that he found both films to be the same film with much the same dialogue and scenes, but with different edits and some scenes shot from different angles. Williams-Paisley responded that Hallmark had let the crew enact her sister Ashley Williams's "idea of two films that take place in the same time frame and sometimes overlap", and producer Neal Dodson explained that "We had one editor and edited them in tandem. They share 9 scenes, with different edits to those scenes that favour whichever sister's movie it is."

Main cast

| Tree Lot Worker
|   Bryan Bernardi

Films

Production and filming
On September 22, 2021, Hallmark announced that the movie series would be part of Hallmark Channel's 2021 "Countdown to Christmas" season block.

Release
Sister Swap: A Hometown Holiday premiered on Hallmark Channel on December 5, 2021.

Sister Swap: Christmas in the City premiered on Hallmark Channel on December 12, 2021,

References

External links
 Sister Swap: A Hometown Holiday
 
 
 Sister Swap: Christmas in the City
 
 

2020s romantic drama films
American Christmas films
American film series
American television films
Christmas television films
Hallmark Channel original films
Television film series
Duologies